Michael "Mike" Collins (born 5 May 1953) is a former Australian rules footballer who played with Melbourne in the Victorian Football League (VFL).

Collins, a recruit from Caulfield, played 27 league games for Melbourne, over four seasons. He made a career high 13 appearances in the 1972 VFL season.

In 1975, Collins was traded to South Adelaide, for Colin Graham.

References

1953 births
Australian rules footballers from Victoria (Australia)
Melbourne Football Club players
Caulfield Football Club players
South Adelaide Football Club players
Living people